Claes Johan Albihn (born 12 May 1971 in Stockholm) is a retired Swedish athlete who specialised in the sprint hurdles. He represented his country at the 1996 Summer Olympics and the 1995 World Championships.

His personal bests are 13.46 seconds in the 110 metres hurdles (-1.8 m/s, Helsinki 1995) and 7.82 seconds in the 60 metres hurdles (Paris 1994).

Competition record

References

1971 births
Living people
Athletes from Stockholm
Swedish male hurdlers
Olympic athletes of Sweden
Athletes (track and field) at the 1996 Summer Olympics
World Athletics Championships athletes for Sweden
20th-century Swedish people